APUA may refer to:

 Alliance for the Prudent Use of Antibiotics
 Anthropological Papers of the University of Alaska

See also 
 Apua, Hawaii, a fishing village